Mike Hogan (born September 30, 1949) is an American politician.

Hogan was born at St. Luke's Hospital in Jacksonville, Florida on September 30, 1949, and graduated from Paxon High School before earning an associate degree at Florida Junior College, followed by a bachelor of arts degree in zoology from the University of South Florida.

A member of the Republican Party, Hogan served on the Jacksonville City Council from 1991 to 1999. He was elected to the Florida House of Representatives twice, in 2000 and 2002. Between 2003 and 2011, Hogan was the Duval County Tax Collector. He ran for mayor in Jacksonville in 2011, losing to Alvin Brown. Florida Governor Rick Scott later appointed Hogan chair of the Public Employees Relations Commission through January 1, 2012. In January 2015, Hogan announced his intention to run for Duval County Supervisor of Elections. He was elected to the position in March 2015.

Hogan married Judy Gunther of Tampa and has three children.

References

1949 births
Living people
Jacksonville, Florida City Council members
University of South Florida alumni
Republican Party members of the Florida House of Representatives
20th-century American politicians
21st-century American politicians
Florida State College at Jacksonville alumni